JumpCloud is an American enterprise software company headquartered in Louisville, Colorado. The company was formally launched in 2013 at TechCrunch Disrupt Battlefield with its announcement of an automated server management tool. JumpCloud’s cloud based directory as a service platform is used to securely manage users identity, devices, and access across things such as VPN, Wi-Fi, Servers and workstations.

History 
JumpCloud received a seed round of funding of 1.2 million in December 2012, and a $3 million Series A round in January 2014. The company completed Series B funding in August 2015 with a $4.3 million investment.

In November 2017, JumpCloud raised an additional $20 million series C round. In May 2019, JumpCloud raised a series D round of financing of $50 million.

In November 2020 it closed a $75 million Series E funding. In January 2021, the company added $25 million to its Series E financing, closing the round at $100 million.

In September 2021, JumpCloud announced a $159 million Series F investment, at a valuation of $2.56 billion.

In early 2020, the company moved to a new office in Louisville, Colorado. During the COVID-19 pandemic, the company became fully remote, with staff in multiple states.

On February 24, 2022, JumpCloud acquired competitor Myki, and by April 10, 2022, all Myki services were shut down.

Product history 
In July 2015, JumpCloud added support for Google Apps to its cloud-based directory service.

In May 2020, JumpCloud added availability of its use through Apple’s Mobile Device Management (MDM), enabling managing of Apple macOS devices via the MDM protocol and support for deployment through Apple’s Device Enrollment Plan (DEP).

JumpCloud introduced conditional access policies to its directory platform in December 2020, enabling IT admins to adopt Zero Trust security.

In August 2021, JumpCloud introduced a new iOS and Android application to help enterprise IT departments with multi-factor authentication.

References 

Information technology companies of the United States
Companies based in Boulder County, Colorado